Lawn bowls at the 2022 Commonwealth Games – Men's pairs was held at the Victoria Park from July 29 to August 2. A total of 38 athletes from 19 associations participated in the event.

Sectional play
The top two from each section advance to the knockout stage.

Section A

Section B

Section C

Section D

Knockout stage

External links
Results

References

Men's pairs